Los Masos is a commune in the Pyrénées-Orientales department in southern France.

Geography 
Los Masos is located in the canton of Les Pyrénées catalanes and in the arrondissement of Prades. The town is also part of the historical region Conflent and is situated 4 km east of Prades.

Population

See also
Communes of the Pyrénées-Orientales department

References

Communes of Pyrénées-Orientales